Amritvarshini is a Hindustani classical raga. It is performed between 7 and 10 p.m.

Theory
The raga contains five notes each in Arohana and Avarohana; Sa Shuddha Ga and Shuddha Ni; TeevraMadhyama and Pa. It is classified as an Audava/Audava pentatonic raga.

Arohana and Avarohana
Aroha (Ascent): 

Avaroha (Descent):

Vadi and Samavadi
Vadi: P

Samvadi: S

Pakad or Chalan
Pakad: SGmPNmPmG, mG->S

Chalan: SGmG, mGS, GmPN, NPmG, GmPNPmG, mG->S;

GmPNS, PNSGmGS, NS NP, NmPmG, mG->S

Organisation and relationships
Thaat: Kalyan

The Raga is based on Carnatic Raga Amritavarshini which is considered a janya rāga of the 66th Melakartha Chitrambari, though it can be derived from other Melakarthas Kalyani, Gamanashrama or Vishwambari by dropping both Rishabh and Dhaivat.

Samay (Time) 
Nomenclature:
Nomenclature for Notation- ‘D ‘n ‘N  ; S r R g G M m P d D n N; S’ r’ R’  /

P, RS – Halt between P and RS/Meenda (Glissando)- P->m /Kana swara (Grace note)  RG

References
“RagaNidhi”- Prof. S Subbarao, Vol.I – Published by The Music Academy, Chennai
“Raga Darshana”- Pt. ManikbuwaThakurdas, Vol.II- Pt.

ManikbuwaThakurdasJanmashabdiSamiti, Mumbai

Film Songs 
Thoongatha vizhigal rendu (Agninakshatram) (Tamil),Composer: Ilayaraja, Singers: KJ Yesudas,Janaki
Vanin Devi Varuga (Oruvar vazhum Alayam) (Tamil),Composer: Ilayaraja, Singers: Spb,Janaki
Malaikoru Devane (Sri Raghavendra) (Tamil),Composer: Ilayaraja, Singers: KJ Yesudas
Unathu Kalai (Sasanam) (Tamil), Composer: Balabharathi, Singers: KS Chitra
Kathiruntha malli (Mallu veeti minor) (Tamil), Composer: Ilayaraja, Singers: P Susheela
Azhagiya Megangal (Ganga Gowri) (Tamil), Composer: MS Viswanathan, Singers: S. Janaki
Sivagami Aada Vanthaal (Paattum Bharathum), Composer: MSV, Singer: P. Susheela, TMS
Ippothenna Thevai (Makkal Aatchi), Composer: Ilayaraja, Singer: Lekha

References

External links
More details about raga Amritvarshini

Hindustani ragas